Mbang may refer to:

Mbang, Cameroon, a commune in Kadey, Est region
Mbang, a term for a ruler of Bagirmi